Gu Hui (October 1930 – 10 September 2013) was a general (shangjiang) of the People's Liberation Army (PLA). He was an alternate member of the 13th Central Committee of the Chinese Communist Party and a member of the 14th Central Committee of the Chinese Communist Party. He was a member of the Standing Committee of the 9th Chinese People's Political Consultative Conference.

Biography
Gu was born Gu Jianye in Gai County (now Gaizhou), Liaoning, in October 1930.

He enlisted in the People's Liberation Army (PLA) in August 1947, and joined the Chinese Communist Party (CCP) in December 1948. During the Chinese Civil War, he served in the Northeast Field Army. In 1950, he participated in the Korean War. In 1958, he entered PLA Military Academy, where he graduated in 1961. In 1975, he was assigned to the Guangzhou Military Region and appointed head of training department of military schools. He became leader of the 9th Group of Tanzanian Military Experts in the following year. In 1979, he won fame for his heroic efforts at the Sino-Vietnamese War. In June 1985, he was promoted to become deputy commander of the Jinan Military Region, a position he held until April 1990, when he was promoted again to become commander of the Nanjing Military Region.

On 10 September 2013, he died from an illness in Nanjing, Jiangsu, at the age of 82.

He was promoted to the rank of lieutenant general (zhongjiang) in 1988 and general (shangjiang) in 1994.

References

1930 births
2013 deaths
People from Gaizhou
Commanders of the Nanjing Military Region
People's Liberation Army generals from Liaoning
People's Republic of China politicians from Liaoning
Chinese Communist Party politicians from Liaoning
Alternate members of the 13th Central Committee of the Chinese Communist Party
Members of the 14th Central Committee of the Chinese Communist Party
Members of the Standing Committee of the 9th Chinese People's Political Consultative Conference